Sand Creek is a  long 1st order tributary to the Niobrara River in Holt County, Nebraska.

Course
Sand Creek rises on the East Branch Louse Creek divide about 3 miles west of Dorsey, Nebraska in Holt County and then flows generally north to join the Niobrara River about 3 miles southeast of Lynch, Nebraska.

Watershed
Sand Creek drains  of area, receives about 24.7 in/year of precipitation, has a wetness index of 548.03, and is about 1.90% forested.

See also

List of rivers of Nebraska

References

Rivers of Holt County, Nebraska
Rivers of Nebraska